There are two main Afro-Belizean ethnic groups:
 Belizean Creole people, also called Kriols
 Garifuna, also called Black Caribs